Micrurus diastema, commonly known as the variable coral snake, is a species of venomous snake in the family Elapidae. The species is endemic  to southeastern Mexico and northern Central America. There are seven recognized subspecies.

Distribution and habitat

Reproduction
M. diastema is oviparous.

Subspecies
There are seven subspecies which are recognized as being valid, including the nominotypical subspecies.
Micrurus diastema affinis 
Micrurus diastema aglaeope 
Micrurus diastema alienus 
Micrurus diastema apiatus 
Micrurus diastema diastema 
Micrurus diastema macdougalli 
Micrurus diastema sapperi

Etymology
The subspecific name, macdougalli, is in honor of naturalist species:Thomas Baillie MacDougall (1896–1973).

The subspecific name, sapperi, is in honor of German explorer Karl Theodor Sapper.

References

Further reading
Duméril A-M-C, Bibron G, Duméril A[-H-A] (1854). Erpétologie générale ou histoire naturelle complète des reptiles. Tome septième. Deuxième partie. Comprenant l'histoire des serpents venimeux (= General Herpetology or Complete Natural History of the Reptiles. Volume 7. Second Part. Containing the [Natural] History of the Venomous Snakes). Paris: Roret. xii + pp. 781–1536. (Elaps diastema, new species, p. 1222). (in French).
Heimes P (2016). Snakes of Mexico: Herpetofauna Mexicana Vol. I. Frankfurt, Germany: Chimaira. 572 pp. .
Schmidt KP (1933). "Preliminary Account of the Coral Snakes of Central America and Mexico". Field Mus. Nat. Hist. Zool. Ser. 20 (6): 29-40. (Micrurus diastema, new combination, pp. 38–39).

diastema
Reptiles described in 1854
Taxa named by André Marie Constant Duméril
Taxa named by Gabriel Bibron
Taxa named by Auguste Duméril
Snakes of Central America
Reptiles of Mexico
Reptiles of Guatemala
Reptiles of Belize
Reptiles of Honduras